Fathulla Jameel (September 5, 1942 – March 1, 2012) was the Minister of Foreign Affairs of Maldives from 1978 to 2005.

Jameel was the Permanent Representative of the Maldives to the United Nations from April 14, 1977 to 1978. He became Minister of Foreign Affairs on March 14, 1978 and, under President Maumoon Abdul Gayoom, held that position for 27 years. On July 14, 2005, he resigned as Minister of Foreign Affairs and was instead appointed as a Special Advisor to the President. On April 30, 2008 he was sworn into the position of senior minister, a relatively new post created by the incumbent president Gayoom.

Early Career and Government Service
Fatuhullah began his public service career on the 18th of November 1969, as a teacher at Majeediyya School. He became the Minister of External Affairs during the presidency of Ibrahim Nasir, on 14 March 1978.

When Maumoon Abdul Qayyoom became President, Fatuhullah was reappointed as Minister of External Affairs towards the end of 1978. He remained at that position until his resignation in July 2005. After resignation, he served as Special Advisor to the President.

In an obituary, Haveeru Daily described him as the father of Maldives foreign diplomacy.

Fatuhullah also served as Minister of State for Planning and Environment at one time. He also was the President’s Member at the People’s Majlis for a long time.

Education and life in Egypt
Fathulla Jameel studied in Al-Azhar University of Egypt and obtained a BA in Islamic Theology. He later attended a postgraduate teacher training course at Ain Shams University.

He was interviewed by Egyptian writer journalist Anis Mansour, after the editor of than famous Al Hilal magazine editor scholar Dr. Hussain Mu'nis suggested that Mr. Mansour interview Maldivian students, for his book حول العالم في 200 يوم (my journey around the world in 200 days). According to Mr. Mansour, Fathulla said that his dream was to become a teacher in a school upon his return, the highest and most prestigious job available than in the Maldives. In Egypt he stayed with his friends, Maumoon Abdul Gayoom and Zahir Hussain, at a Maldivian government leased flat, in the Al-Hilmiyyaa area of Cairo.

Fathulla was the second generation to study in Egypt. Before him his father, Mr. Muhammad Jameel Didi studied in Egypt during King Fuad and Farooq's reign.

He obtained his primary, secondary and tertiary education in Egypt at Mauhadhul Qahira in Dharraasa ward.

Peers describe him as an intelligent person and his many skills include drawing, singing and playing guitar and was known to crack jokes that go along with the occasion.

Fathulla was an avid supporter of Egyptian Zamalek SC Football Club and he named his residence after the Club Zamalek.

Death
Fathulla Jameel died on Thursday, March 1, 2012 at Singapore General Hospital from heart disease.  He was 69. Maldives President Mohammed Waheed Hassan Manik sent his condolences for the family and declared the national flag to be flown at half mast for three days.

Quotes on Fathulla
 "those were difficult days and we were able to build a good relation with other countries because of Fathulla"; Maumoon Abdul Gayoom.
 "Maldives has not witnessed such an intelligent personality"; he carries a political weight" Dr. Ahmed Shaheed.
 "we did not had a law on foreign relations then and Fathulla was the law than"; Abdul Azeez Yusuf, Maldives High Commissioner in New Delhi.

References

1942 births
2012 deaths
Foreign Ministers of the Maldives
Environment Ministers of the Maldives 
Permanent Representatives of the Maldives to the United Nations
Al-Azhar University alumni
Ain Shams University alumni